FC Chernomorets Burgas or simply Chernomorets was a Bulgarian football club from the city of Burgas. Chernomorets played its home matches at the local Chernomorets Stadium. The team was a runner-up in the Bulgarian Cup and Bulgarian Supercup competitions.

Chernomorets established itself as one of the most consistent teams in Bulgaria, spending most of its history in the top tier A Group. Financial problems started in the early 2000s however, and the club eventually folded after the 2005-06 season. An unofficial successor, PSFC Chernomorets Burgas was soon founded. The new club played in the top tier between 2007 and 2014, but also encountered financial problems, folding in 2019. A third club from Burgas was created in the wake of PSFC Chernomorets’ problems, named FC Chernomorets 1919 Burgas, which began playing in the amateur levels.

Club colours

Kit history

History

1905–1958
In 1905, a group of Bulgarian students from the Robert College of Istanbul created a new sports club in Burgas with the name SC Strela. Several years later, SC Strela was officially licensed as an association and in May, 1912, the local municipality chose the first staff and the first president of the club. In the period between 1918–1919, SC Strela had a roster of 200 members, slowly growing into an association with a big importance to the city. Тherefore some changes had to be made and on August 1, 1919, the first president of the club was chosen to be Stefan Ilic. By his suggestion, the club's name was chosen to be changed to SC Chernomorets and the same year, a football department was created to the sports society, named FC Chernomorets.

Between 1919 and 1944, the football club participated in the Bulgarian State Championship, regularly promoting and relegating from the different divisions of the league. In the following years several changes were made. In 1944, the club was bought by the Municipality of Burgas, its name was changed to FC Lyuboslav and a new manager was hired – the prominent Hungarian coach Kramer Lipot. However the results weren't good and soon he was sacked from his job. Years later, the bad results were the reason to bring FC Lyuboslav to a dissolve.

1958–2006
In 1958, the communist authorities in Burgas decided to reestablish a sports club, which is a successor of the achievements of the former FC Chernomorets. The sports club was named SC Botev in honour of the Bulgarian national hero – Hristo Botev. Several years later, the authorities however decided to rename the club to its former name FC Chernomorets.

FC Chernomorets's best seasons in the Bulgarian top division were in the 1981/82 and 1983/84 seasons, finishing in the 5th place. Since its establishment, the club had played a total of 31 seasons in the Bulgarian top division. In 1989, Chernomorets surprisingly reached the final of the Bulgarian Cup and played against CSKA Sofia, but the result of the match was a 0:3 loss for Chernomorets. In spite of loss, the team led by Dian Petkov, Zlatko Yankov, Lyubomir Sheytanov and Vlado Stoyanov, the Sharks managed to earn a position to participate in the UEFA Cup Winners' Cup. The club's first participation in European club tournaments was not promising. The team faced Dinamo Tirana from Albania. The first game in Burgas, in the presence of 17 000 spectators at the Chernomorets Stadium, ended with a 3–1 win. But the second game in Tirana finished with a shameful 0–4 loss and Chernomorets were out of the European club tournament. A few years later, in 1994 Chernomorets were relegated to Southern "B" Group and its return to A PFG in 1999 was with his new owner Ivaylo Drazhev, who had bought the club in 1997.

In 2004, the club with president Ivaylo Drazhev went bankrupt and in the following two seasons Chernomorets was relegated from the top divisions of the Bulgarian football. The future of the club was unknown and in late 2006 FC Chernomorets withdrew from the South-East V AFG because of financial difficulties.

Historical names

Performance by seasons
{|class="wikitable"
|- style="background:#efefef;"
! Season
!
! Pos.
! Pl.
! W
! D
! L
! GS
! GA
! P
! Cup
! Notes
|-
|1938
|BSFC
|align=right |8
|align=right|18||align=right|4||align=right|4||align=right|10
|align=right|30||align=right|40||align=right|12
||N/A
|
|-
|1939
|BSFC
|align=right bgcolor=red|10
|align=right|18||align=right|0||align=right|4||align=right|14
|align=right|17||align=right|61||align=right|4
||N/A
|Relegated
|-
|1948–49
|RFD
|align=right bgcolor=red|10
|align=right|18||align=right|2||align=right|3||align=right|13
|align=right|15||align=right|38||align=right|7
||1/4
|Relegated
|-
|1957
|Southern B RFG
|align=right |8
|align=right|30||align=right|10||align=right|10||align=right|10
|align=right|42||align=right|50||align=right|30
||N/A
|
|-
|1958
|Southern B RFG
|align=right |10
|align=right|15||align=right|5||align=right|4||align=right|6
|align=right|17||align=right|18||align=right|14
||N/A
|
|-
|1958–59
|Southern B RFG
|align=right bgcolor=red|10
|align=right|30||align=right|13||align=right|5||align=right|11
|align=right|45||align=right|42||align=right|31
||1/4
|Relegated
|-
|1961–62
|B RFG
|align=right |10
|align=right|30||align=right|9||align=right|8||align=right|13
|align=right|41||align=right|49||align=right|26
||N/A
|
|-
|1962–63
|Southern B RFG
|align=right |11
|align=right|38||align=right|15||align=right|6||align=right|17
|align=right|61||align=right|55||align=right|36
||N/A
|
|-
|1963–64
|Southern B RFG
|align=right |6
|align=right|34||align=right|13||align=right|13||align=right|8
|align=right|53||align=right|42||align=right|39
||N/A
|
|-
|1964–65
|Southern B RFG
|style="text-align:right; background:lime;" |1
|align=right|34||align=right|19||align=right|6||align=right|9
|align=right|57||align=right|29||align=right|44
||N/A
|Promoted
|-
|1965–66
|A RFG
|align=right |14
|align=right|30||align=right|8||align=right|9||align=right|13
|align=right|34||align=right|48||align=right|25
||1/8
|
|-
|1966–67
|A RFG
|align=right |9
|align=right|30||align=right|10||align=right|10||align=right|10
|align=right|38||align=right|35||align=right|30
||2nd in Group 1
|
|-
|1967–68
|A RFG
|align=right |13
|align=right|30||align=right|9||align=right|7||align=right|14
|align=right|35||align=right|53||align=right|25
||1/2
|
|-
|1968–69
|A RFG
|align=right |7
|align=right|30||align=right|10||align=right|8||align=right|12
|align=right|51||align=right|56||align=right|28
||3rd in Group 1
|
|-
|1969–70
|A RFG
|align=right |8
|align=right|30||align=right|10||align=right|9||align=right|11
|align=right|33||align=right|41||align=right|29
||1/8
|
|-
|1970–71
|A RFG
|align=right |15
|align=right|30||align=right|6||align=right|7||align=right|17
|align=right|33||align=right|66||align=right|19
||3rd in Group 3
|
|-
|1971–72
|A RFG
|align=right |14
|align=right|34||align=right|11||align=right|8||align=right|15
|align=right|47||align=right|49||align=right|28
||1/16
|
|-
|1972–73
|A RFG
|align=right bgcolor=red|12
|align=right|34||align=right|12||align=right|7||align=right|15
|align=right|35||align=right|44||align=right|31
||1/4
|drawn
|-
|1973–74
|Southern B RFG
|align=right |2
|align=right|36||align=right|23||align=right|6||align=right|7
|align=right|81||align=right|34||align=right|52
||1/4
|
|-
|1974–75
|Southern B RFG
|align=right |2
|align=right|38||align=right|18||align=right|8||align=right|12
|align=right|52||align=right|40||align=right|44
||N/A
|
|-
|1975–76
|Southern B RFG
|align=right |7
|align=right|38||align=right|16||align=right|8||align=right|14
|align=right|61||align=right|47||align=right|40
||1/32
|
|-
|1976–77
|Southern B RFG
|style="text-align:right; background:lime;" |1
|align=right|38||align=right|20||align=right|10||align=right|8
|align=right|60||align=right|30||align=right|50
||1/32
|Promoted
|-
|1977–78
|A RFG
|align=right |10
|align=right|30||align=right|11||align=right|5||align=right|14
|align=right|45||align=right|43||align=right|27
||1/16
|
|-
|1978–79
|A RFG
|align=right |5
|align=right|30||align=right|13||align=right|8||align=right|9
|align=right|45||align=right|43||align=right|34
||1/8
|
|-
|1979–80
|A RFG
|align=right |9
|align=right|30||align=right|12||align=right|3||align=right|15
|align=right|39||align=right|42||align=right|27
||1/4
|
|-
|1980–81
|A RFG
|align=right |11
|align=right|30||align=right|9||align=right|10||align=right|11
|align=right|42||align=right|49||align=right|28
||1st leg
|
|-
|1981–82
|A RFG
|align=right |6
|align=right|30||align=right|14||align=right|4||align=right|12
|align=right|48||align=right|44||align=right|32
||N/A
|
|-
|1982–83
|A RFG
|align=right |13
|align=right|30||align=right|12||align=right|4||align=right|14
|align=right|41||align=right|47||align=right|28
||N/A
|
|-
|1983–84
|A RFG
|align=right |5
|align=right|30||align=right|12||align=right|7||align=right|11
|align=right|43||align=right|47||align=right|31
||N/A
|
|-
|1984–85
|A RFG
|align=right bgcolor=red|16
|align=right|30||align=right|8||align=right|5||align=right|17
|align=right|35||align=right|57||align=right|21
||N/A
|Relegated
|-
|1985–86
|B RFG
|style="text-align:right; background:lime;" |1
|align=right|38||align=right|21||align=right|7||align=right|10
|align=right|81||align=right|42||align=right|48
||N/A
|Promoted
|-
|1986–87
|A RFG
|align=right |12
|align=right|30||align=right|10||align=right|4||align=right|16
|align=right|48||align=right|76||align=right|24
||N/A
|
|-
|1987–88
|A RFG
|align=right bgcolor=red|15
|align=right|30||align=right|9||align=right|3||align=right|18
|align=right|27||align=right|50||align=right|21
||1/4
|Relegated
|-
|1988–89
|B RFG
|style="text-align:right; background:lime;" |2
|align=right|38||align=right|20||align=right|10||align=right|8
|align=right|63||align=right|32||align=right|50
||Final
|Promoted
|-
|1989–90
|A RFG
|align=right |11
|align=right|30||align=right|11||align=right|7||align=right|12
|align=right|36||align=right|41||align=right|29
||N/A
|
|-
|1990–91
|A FG
|align=right |7
|align=right|30||align=right|11||align=right|8||align=right|11
|align=right|41||align=right|50||align=right|30
||2nd in Group 1
|
|-
|1991–92
|A RFG
|align=right |12
|align=right|30||align=right|8||align=right|9||align=right|13
|align=right|28||align=right|43||align=right|25
||1/16
|
|-
|1992–93
|A RFG
|align=right |8
|align=right|30||align=right|11||align=right|8||align=right|11
|align=right|33||align=right|31||align=right|30
||1/8
|
|-
|1993–94
|A FG
|align=right bgcolor=red|13
|align=right|28||align=right|8||align=right|6||align=right|14
|align=right|30||align=right|36||align=right|30
||1/16
|Relegated
|-
|1994–95
|Southern B RFG
|align=right bgcolor=red|9
|align=right|30||align=right|13||align=right|7||align=right|10
|align=right|43||align=right|35||align=right|46
||N/A
|Relegated
|-
|1995–96
|South East V Group
|style="text-align:right; background:lime;" |-
|align=right|-||align=right|-||align=right|-||align=right|-
|align=right|-||align=right|-||align=right|-
||3rd leg
|Promoted
|-
|1996–97
|B RFG
|align=right |7
|align=right|34||align=right|16||align=right|4||align=right|14
|align=right|51||align=right|39||align=right|52
||1/8
|
|-
|1997–98
|B RFG
|align=right |4
|align=right|30||align=right|18||align=right|5||align=right|7
|align=right|50||align=right|17||align=right|59
||1/16
|
|-
|1998–99
|B RFG
|style="text-align:right; background:lime;" |1
|align=right|30||align=right|21||align=right|3||align=right|6
|align=right|62||align=right|20||align=right|66
||2nd leg
|Promoted
|-
|1999-00
|A FG
|align=right |10
|align=right|30||align=right|10||align=right|7||align=right|13
|align=right|31||align=right|40||align=right|37
||1/2
|
|-
|2000–01
|Premier football league
|align=right |11
|align=right|26||align=right|6||align=right|4||align=right|16
|align=right|22||align=right|48||align=right|22
||1/16
|
|-
|2001–02
|Premier football league
|align=right |10
|align=right|40||align=right|13||align=right|9||align=right|18
|align=right|41||align=right|69||align=right|35
||1/16
|
|-
|2002–03
|Premier football league
|align=right |11
|align=right|26||align=right|7||align=right|3||align=right|16
|align=right|32||align=right|56||align=right|24
||1/4
|
|-
|2003–04
|A FG
|align=right bgcolor=red|16
|align=right|30||align=right|4||align=right|6||align=right|20
|align=right|30||align=right|68||align=right|18
||1/8
|Relegated
|-
|2004–05
|B PFG
|align=right bgcolor=red|15
|align=right|30||align=right|5||align=right|4||align=right|21
|align=right|29||align=right|64||align=right|19
||1st leg
|Relegated
|-
|2005–06
|South East V Group
|align=right|14
|align=right|30||align=right|6||align=right|5||align=right|19
|align=right|26||align=right|56||align=right|23
||N/A
|
|-
|2006–07
|South East V Group
|align=right bgcolor=red|18
|align=right|34||align=right|0||align=right|0||align=right|34
|align=right|8||align=right|161||align=right|0
||N/A
|Withdrawn
|-
|}

European
Intertoto Cup and UEFA Cup

Honours

Bulgarian A PFG:
 Fifth place (2): 1979, 1984

Bulgarian Cup
 Runner-up (1): 1989

Bulgarian Supercup
 Runner-up (1): 1989

Notable players
For all players with a Wikipedia article see :Category:FC Chernomorets Burgas players.

Notable coaches

 Kramer Lipot
 Evgeni Yanchovski
 Totko Dremsizov – lead the sharks seven years in a row (record)
 Lyubomir Borisov
 Vasil Zelev – the most successful coach for the club
 Ivan Tsvetanov
 Miroslav Kralev

External links
Chernomorets Burgas at bgclubs.eu

Association football clubs established in 1919
Association football clubs disestablished in 2006
Defunct football clubs in Bulgaria
Football clubs in Burgas
1919 establishments in Bulgaria
2006 disestablishments in Bulgaria